Frederick Harvey "Tommy" Thomas (December 19, 1892 – January 15, 1986) was an American professional baseball third baseman. He played in Major League Baseball (MLB) from 1918 to 1920 for the Boston Red Sox, Philadelphia Athletics, and Washington Senators.

In 1916, Thomas was acquired by the Boston Red Sox with Sam Jones from the Cleveland Indians in exchange for Tris Speaker. He entered the majors in 1918, hitting .257 in 44 games, and was a member of the World Champions Red Sox in the 1918 Series. Before the 1919 season, he was dealt to the Philadelphia Athletics and posted career-highs in games (124), hits (96), runs (42) and stolen bases (12), while hitting .212. He divided his playing time with the Athletics and Washington Senators in 1920, his last major league season.

In a three-year career, Thomas was a .225 hitter (193-for-859) with four home runs and 45 RBI in 247 games, including 88 runs, 19 doubles, 14 triples, and 24 stolen bases. He also hit .118 in six Series games (2-for-17).

Thomas died at the age of 93 in Rice Lake, Wisconsin. He was the last surviving member of the 1918 World Champion Boston Red Sox.

He has been credited for starting the tradition of standing during playing of the National Anthem at baseball games, at the 1918 Series.

References

External links
Baseball Reference
Retrosheet

Boston Red Sox players
Philadelphia Athletics players
Washington Senators (1901–1960) players
Major League Baseball third basemen
American military personnel of World War I
Baseball players from Wisconsin
Military personnel from Wisconsin
People from Rice Lake, Wisconsin
1892 births
1986 deaths
Green Bay Bays players
Omaha Rourkes players
New Orleans Pelicans (baseball) players
Providence Grays (minor league) players
Reading Marines players
Reading Aces players
Reading Keystones players
Buffalo Bisons (minor league) players